Uthayakumar s/o Ponnusamy (Tamil: உதயகுமார் பொன்னுசாமி) (born 7 November 1961) is a Malaysian lawyer of Tamil origin. He is the older brother of P. Waytha Moorthy, HINDRAF (the Hindu Rights Action Force) lawyer who headed a team of lawyers to file a class action suit against the United Kingdom for "abandoning minority Indians to the mercy of majoritarian Malay rule while granting independence on August 31, 1957". Although Uthayakumar is only a legal advisor of HINDRAF, a coalition of several non-governmental organisations, he is regarded as the de facto leader of HINDRAF.

Early life
Uthayakumar was born on 7 November 1961 to Ponnusamy s/o Arunasalam, a train driver who was a first generation immigrant. Uthayakumar's paternal grandfather, Arunasalam was a citizen of British India in present-day India. Arunasalam was brought into Malaysia then known as Malaya to work as a labourer in a rubber estate.

Uthayakumar was brought up in Kelantan, where 99 percent of the population is Malay, 0.9 percent Chinese and 0.1 percent Indian. This enabled him to speak fluent Kelantan Malay. He revealed that he had a Malay girlfriend for five years, but because he had to convert to Islam to marry her, Uthayakumar had to go his separate way. In an interview with Malaysiakini, Uthayakumar said that he was very patriotic to the point that he called himself a Malaysian and at one point refused to visit India. He also wore a pin of the Malaysian flag on his blazer during his student times, despite the fact that his friends poked fun at him. When Uthayakumar started his legal firm, he put a Malaysian flag on his working desk. Uthayakumar took off the flag after the 2001 Kampung Medan riots incident because;

Uthayakumar then said that he had no problems with the Malay people as much as he had problems with the UMNO led government.

HINDRAF
Uthayakumar is the legal advisor and the de facto leader of HINDRAF which is not in good terms with the Malaysian Government.

Arrest on 30 October 2007
On 30 October 2007, Uthayakumar and other HINDRAF lawyers – M. Manoharan, P. Waytha Moorthy and V. Ganapathi Rao were arrested at 11:00 p. m. and detained until 8:00 a. m. the following morning for taking part in a demonstration against the demolishment of a Hindu Shrine in Kuala Lumpur. All of the lawyers then filed a suit against seven defendants including the government for the "unlawful arrest" on 5 November 2007. They are seeking 20 million Malaysian Ringgits each in compensation while Waytha Moorthy is seeking 25 million.

Office raid on 19 November 2007
On 19 November 2007, Uthayakumar's office in Kuala Lumpur was raided by the police to search for a book deemed seditious under the Sedition Act. The police were unable to find the book but instead confiscated some fliers. When Uthayakumar called his brother's (Waytha Moorthy Ponnusamy) office in Seremban, which was also being raided at the same time, he scolded two police officers for recording the legal office staff's statements and slammed them for not following procedure.

Arrest for HINDRAF rally
Police arrested Uthayakumar in the morning of 23 November 2007 to prevent him from taking part in the 2007 HINDRAF rally. He was given a discharge later for an error on the part of the prosecution.

Uthayakumar's car
On 8:00 a.m. 3 December 2007, Uthayakumar discovered that his Volvo 240's tires were slashed. In his police report, Uthayakumar stated that he suspects the United Malays National Organisation (UMNO) to be behind the slashing. He also stated that a car bearing licence plate number AFL5280 was spying on him for the past eight months and that should anything happen to him, he would hold UMNO's top leadership responsible.

Rearrest for sedition charges
Uthayakumar was arrested on 11 December 2007, to face a fresh sedition charge. Despite the fact that the maximum fine for sedition in Malaysia is 5,000 Malaysian ringgits, bail was set at 50,000 Malaysian ringgits. After Uthayakumar posted bail, he was immediately rearrested and brought to Pudu prison. The charges against Uthayakumar were dropped soon after and he was released on 12 December 2007.

Arrest under Internal Security Act 
On 13 December 2007, Uthayakumar and other HINDRAF members M. Manoharan, V. S. Ganapathy Rao, K. Kengadhadran and T. Vasantha Kumar were arrested under the Internal Security Act (ISA). Some sources say that the arrest on 13 December was chosen to symbolise the 13 May incident. Uthayakumar left two parting videos for his supporters saying that he had expected his arrest under the ISA. Uthayakumar thanked HINDRAF supporters for their support and reminded them to be peaceful and not to resort to violence. He was released from ISA detention in 2009.

Personal life
Uthaykumar is married to Indradevi and currently lives in Kuala Lumpur, with his children. He is also the elder brother of Former HINDRAF chairman and Malaysian Advancement Party (MAP) Founder, P. Waytha Moorthy.

See also
 Human Rights Party Malaysia (HRP)

References

1961 births
Living people
Malaysian Hindus
20th-century Malaysian lawyers
Human Rights Party Malaysia politicians
Malaysian democracy activists
Malaysian human rights activists
Malaysian prisoners and detainees
People from Kelantan
Malaysian activists
Malaysian people of Indian descent
Malaysian people of Tamil descent
Prisoners and detainees of Malaysia
Independent politicians in Malaysia
Malaysian political party founders
21st-century Malaysian lawyers